Vermont Heights is an unincorporated community in St. Johns County, Florida, United States. It is located on State Road 207, west of I-95.

Geography
Vermont Heights is located at  (29.81, -81.3972). Vermont Heights is the location of the Coquina Crossing Mobile Home Park and St. Augustine Community School of Performing Arts, both of which give their addresses as being in Elkton to the southwest.

A Florida East Coast Railway line formerly ran through Vermont Heights from St. Augustine to Palatka, and included a station. Today this line is part of the Palatka-to-St. Augustine State Trail, and two trailheads exist within the community.

References

Unincorporated communities in St. Johns County, Florida
Unincorporated communities in the Jacksonville metropolitan area
Unincorporated communities in Florida